Events from the year 1727 in Ireland.

Incumbent
Monarch: George I (until 11 June), then George II

Events
 June 11 – George II becomes King of Great Britain and Ireland upon the death of George I.
 The Irish are permitted to trade in Youghal as corn is scarce; there are riots against its export to other parts.
 St. James's Hospital, Dublin, opens.
 Jonathan Swift's A Short View of the State of Ireland is written.

Births
April 23 – George Anne Bellamy, actress (d. 1788)
December 27 – Arthur Murphy, editor and writer (d. 1805)

Deaths

June 11 – George I of Great Britain (b. 1660)

References

 
Years of the 18th century in Ireland
Ireland
1720s in Ireland